is a role-playing video game developed by Genki exclusively for PlayStation 2. It is the sequel to Jade Cocoon: Story of the Tamamayu. The game features a full 3D polygonal world, 200 cutscenes, and full voice-overs.

Plot 
Jade Cocoon 2'''s plot occurs 100 years after the events in the original Jade Cocoon. The time of the Nagi people and "cocoon masters" has passed. New "cocoon masters" are now cited as "beasthunters" and are the prominent force of monster raising, with the player playing one named Kahu who visits the Temple of Kemuel in the hopes of becoming a beasthunter and having adventures like the old cocoon masters he's idolized. However, Kahu encounters trouble during his license exam required to become a full-fledged beast-hunter. He encounters a young fairy named Nico, who leaves Kahu cursed, and he's given a very short time to live before his body is consumed by evil. Kemuel Temple's resident guardian, Levant - the hero of the original Jade Cocoon - offers Kahu a chance to heal himself. By utilizing the four magical orbs found in the heart of the elemental forests and a dark lute, Levant will be able to save Kahu's life. Kahu now sets off on his adventure, to save himself and eventually the world. Other characters from the first Jade Cocoon also appear, like Kikinak, who became a rich shopkeeper thanks to Levant. A statue of Mahbu, the Nagi Maiden, can also be seen at the room where Levant is.

 Reception 

The game received "generally favorable reviews", a bit more positive than the first Jade Cocoon, according to the review aggregation website Metacritic. In Japan, Famitsu'' gave it a score of 31 out of 40.

References

External links 
 at Genki website 

2001 video games
Fantasy video games
Genki (company) games
Multiplayer and single-player video games
PlayStation 2 games
PlayStation 2-only games
Role-playing video games
Studio Ghibli
Ubisoft games
Video game sequels
Video games about evolution
Video games developed in Japan
Video games scored by Manami Matsumae